Tore Løvland (born 8 November 1965) is a retired Norwegian football defender.

He joined IK Start from FK Vigør ahead of the 1990 season, and remained there throughout 1996.

References

1965 births
Living people
Sportspeople from Kristiansand
Norwegian footballers
FK Vigør players
IK Start players
Norwegian First Division players
Eliteserien players
Association football defenders